Reclaim Australia is the debut studio album from Australian hip hop duo A.B. Original, released on 28 November 2016 through Golden Era Records.

The title refers to the far-right Australian political party of the same name, and the album covers issues themes including police brutality, Indigenous deaths in custody and Australia Day.

Reclaim Australia peaked at number 10 on the ARIA Albums Chart and won various awards, including the Australian Music Prize, Australian Album of the Year at the 2016 J Awards, and both Best Independent Album or EP and Best Independent Hip Hop Album at the 2017 AIR Independent Music Awards.

Critical reception
Ariana Norton from Beat Magazine said "Simmering with anger and set to classic '80s hip hop beats, Reclaim Australia is immediately reminiscent of N.W.A in its unapologetic approach to the injustices still faced by Aboriginal Australians. The album includes excerpts of speeches made about 'breeding out' Aboriginal people, as well as an introduction by Archie Roach, who remembers protesting for land rights in the '70s... There's a deep pain and anguish that underlies Reclaim Australias ferocity. Briggs and Trials demand that we sit up, take notice and take action.

Bernard Zuel from Sydney Morning Herald said "Reclaim Australia is the most forthright, engaged and wholly committed political musical statement made here in a long time." adding "You will find yourself saying hell yeah this is appalling, still; shouting at the radio/stereo/phone in unison with Briggs and Trials; and declaring I'm seriously bloody angry".

David James Young from Music Feeds called the album a "successful experiment" saying "It's playful, but never to the point of losing sight of the message. It's forthright and unapologetic about the issues it discusses, but neither Briggs nor Rankine are ever in a position to let a punchline or sarcastic quip slip through their fingers."

Sosefina Fuamoli from The AU Review called the album "a masterclass" saying "What's great about A.B Original and Reclaim Australia is that their approach leaves no stone unturned; this isn't rap music doled out for its pure shock factor. This is music that channels the anger and pain of people who have long been stood over and have been demeaned and dehumanised for generations. It might be hard to listen to, but that's the point. Where the majority of listeners (myself included) have had the opportunity to turn a blind eye and turn the volume down, this album is an insight into the lives of those who have been stripped of that choice."

Track listing

Personnel
A.B. Original
 Briggs – writing, vocals 
 Trials – vocals , production 

Other musicians
 Archie Roach – writing, vocals 
 Daniel Rankine – writing 
 Darren Reutens – writing, production 
 Guilty Simpson – writing, vocals 
 Caiti Baker – writing, vocals 
 SmokeyGotBeatz – writing, production 
 Dan Sultan – writing, vocals 
 Rodney-O – vocals 
 Hau Latukefu – writing, vocals 
 Michael Hohnen – writing 
 James Mangohig – writing, production 
 King T – writing, vocals 
 Jacob Turier – writing  
 Jayteehazard – production 
 Thelma Plum – writing, vocals 
 M. Bryant – writing 
 Rob Conely – writing, production 
 Gurrumul Yunupingu – writing, vocals

Charts

Release history

References

2016 debut albums
A.B. Original albums
Golden Era Records albums